The Main Directorate for Servicing the Diplomatic Corps under the Ministry of Foreign Affairs of Russia, or shortly GlavUpDK is an entity under the Russian Ministry of Foreign Affairs. The current director general is Vladimir Paschko. GlavUpDK under the MFA of Russia is a commercial organization, being under the command of the Ministry of Foreign Affairs of the Russian Federation. The founders of the company are the Government of the Russian Federation, Federal Agency for State Property Management and the Ministry of Foreign Affairs of the Russian Federation.

The primary business activity of the organization is all-round provision and service for diplomatic and other foreign representations in Moscow. However, obtained for almost a secular period of work  experience and higher professionalism of the employees allow GlavUpDK to extend the scope of their business and offer wide range of the services to Russian and foreign public and commercial organizations.

GlavUpDK provides renting services of residential premises and offices, medical services, hosting of business and entertainment events, provides accounting,  HR services and transportation services.

Now the services of the GlavUpDK as often called  ‘ministry of hospitality’ are used by over 180 embassies and representatives of international organizations, over 100 correspondent offices of Mass Media and over 2000 Russian and foreign companies.

Foreign relations of Russia
Foreign relations of the Soviet Union